Julian Walter Fagan III (born February 21, 1948) is a former American football punter in the National Football League. He played for the New Orleans Saints and New York Jets. He played college football for the Ole Miss Rebels.

References

1948 births
Living people
American football punters
New Orleans Saints players
New York Jets players
Ole Miss Rebels football players
People from Laurel, Mississippi
Players of American football from Mississippi